Century Aviation SA de CV was a project of a charter airline. The project was launched in mid 2003 planning flights between Mexico City and PRC, but the commencement of the Gulf War and the SARS epidemic caused the cancellation of the project in the same year. The planned fleet was 2 Boeing 757-200 with all-business class configuration.

History
The project was launched in 2003.

References

Defunct airlines of Mexico
Airlines established in 2003
Airlines disestablished in 2003
All articles lacking sources